Habitability refers to the adequacy of an environment for human living. Where housing is concerned, there are generally local ordinances which define habitability. If a residence complies with those laws it is said to be habitable. In extreme environments, such as space exploration, habitability must take into account psychological and social stressors, due to the harsh nature of the environment.

Habitability in law 
Habitability is the conformance of a residence or abode to the implied warranty of habitability. A residence that complies is said to be habitable. It is an implied warranty or contract, meaning it does not have to be an express contract, covenant, or provision of a contract.  There was no implied warranty of habitability for tenants at common law and the legal doctrine has since developed in many jurisdictions through housing laws and regulations.
Habitability is a common law doctrine that is largely synonymous with tenantability. In Architecture, the term habitability is understood to be an umbrella term for the suitability and value of a built habitat for its inhabitants in a specific environment over time.

In order to be habitable, such housing usually:
 must provide shelter, with working locks
 must be heated in the winter months (typically between October 1 and May 31 in the Northeastern United States)
 must not be infested with vermin, roaches, termites, or mold
 requires the landlord to stop other tenants from making too much noise (as measured by the decibel scale), second-hand smoke, or from selling narcotics
 must provide potable water
 each jurisdiction may have various rules.

New York law
Some states, such as New York, have given additional statutory protections in addition to those created by caselaw.  These statutes include:
 Lobby attendant service by a concierge or landlord 
 Elevator mirrors 
 Smoke detectors
 Window guards
 Intercoms and self-locking doors
 Protection from lead paint

Consequences
Violation of the warranty of habitability results in constructive eviction, whereby the landlord or lessor has, in effect, evicted the tenant or lessee. The tenant may remedy the problem, or complain to local government authorities for remedies.

See also
Real property
Real estate
Implied warranty of habitability

Habitability in extreme environments 
Human Factors and habitability are important topics for working and living spaces. For space exploration, they are vital for mission success. One of the critical characteristics for living and working in extreme environments the dependency on the habitat, its technological capability as well as the sociospatial framing. Inhabitants who are exposed to remote and hostile environments, not only must overcome the challenges posed by the dangers and limitations imposed by the particular environment itself, but also experience significant distress from being confined indoors and isolated from civilization and social contact.

Components of the system include: The setting, the individual, the group or (microsociety) and the time. Support and evidence for the need of integrating habitability can be found in every decade. Thomas M. Fraser suggested "that habitability can be considered as the equilibrium state, resulting from man-machine-environment-mission interactions which permits man to maintain physiological homeostasis, adequate performance, and psycho-social integrity".

Habitability of islands 
In 2020, the island of Kökar in the Baltic Sea, not satisfied with common sustainability methods and tools, created a tool called habitability to measure their own attractiveness as a place to live. Important characteristics of island societies which have previously been overlooked are, amongst others, the extreme seasonal shifts in human pressure, the need to define distances in time, the intricate business ecosystem of islands, and the transition to renewable, locally produced energy. The tool includes 45 indicators grouped into seven areas that can be used to test the habitability of an island society. The Finnish Ministry of Economic Affairs end Employment has commissioned Åbo Academy University to implement this tool among the 600 inhabited Finnish islands, and the toolbox is presently being translated into Croatian.

See also
 Space habitation
 Lunar habitation

References

External links
 Evicting Tenants in New York
 The Attorney General of the State of New York's page
 Pennsylvania law - Lehigh Valley Legal Services

Contract law
Landlord–tenant law
Real property law
Legal doctrines and principles